Darragh Mooney (born 10 March 1992) is an Irish hurler who plays as a goalkeeper for the Tipperary senior team. He plays his club hurling for Éire Óg Annacarty.

Career
Mooney was part of the Tipperary Under-21 hurling panel in 2012 and 2013 and Intermediate hurling panel in 2014 and 2015. He made his competitive debut for Tipperary in the 2016 National Hurling League against Clare on 3 April 2016 where Tipperary lost by 2-13 to 0-18 in Cusack Park in Ennis.
He was the substitute goalkeeper as Tipperary went on to win the 2016 Munster and All-Ireland Senior Hurling Championships.

Mooney made his first championship start for Tipperary on 1 July 2017 in the 2-18 to 0-15 win against Westmeath in round 1 of the All Ireland Qualifiers in Semple Stadium.

Honours

Player

Tipperary
All-Ireland Senior Hurling Championship (1): 2016 (sub)
Munster Senior Hurling Championship (1): 2016 (sub)

References

External links
Tipperary GAA Profile

1992 births
Living people
Tipperary inter-county hurlers
Hurling goalkeepers
Éire Óg Annacarty hurlers